Apamea or Apameia is the name of several Hellenistic cities in western Asia, after Apama, the Sogdian wife of Seleucus I Nicator, several of which are also former bishoprics and Catholic titular see.

Places called Apamea include:

Asia Minor (Turkey)
 Apamea (Euphrates), in Osroene, opposite Zeugma on the Euphrates, now flooded by the Birecik Dam
 Apamea (Phrygia) or Apamea Cibotus, formerly Kibotos, commercial center of Phrygia, near Celaenae, now at Dinar, Afyonkarahisar Province; former bishopric and now a Latin Catholic titular bishopric
 Apamea Myrlea or Apamea in Bithynia, formerly Myrlea and Brylleion, in Bithynia, on the Sea of Marmara; currently near Mudanya, Bursa Province; former archdiocese, Latin Catholic titular archbishopric

Iraq
 Apamea (Babylonia), on the Tigris near the Euphrates, precise location unknown
 Apamea (Sittacene), on the Tigris, precise location unknown

Iran (Persia)
 Apamea (Media), in Media, near Laodicea (Nahavand, Iran), precise location unknown
 Apamea Ragiana, south of the Caspian Gates, in Parthia (later Media)

Syria
 Apamea, Syria, on the Orontes River, northwest of Hama, Syria, a former Roman provincial capital and Metropolitan Archbishopric, now 
 Latin Catholic titular Metropolitan archbishopric
 Melkite Catholic titular Metropolitan archbishopric
 Syriac Catholic Catholic titular Metropolitan archbishopric
 Greek Orthodox titular bishopric
 Maronite Catholic titular bishopric

See also 
 Treaty of Apamea
 Apama (disambiguation)

Ancient Greek archaeological sites in Turkey
Former populated places in Iraq
Former populated places in Iran
Lost ancient cities and towns